Jyrelle Justin O'Connor (born May 6, 1999), known professionally as Loski (formerly Lil' Nizzy), is a British rapper and singer from Kennington, London. He is part of the Kennington-based UK drill group Harlem Spartans.

Beginning his career in 2012 under the name Lil' Nizzy, Loski released his breakout single "Hazards" in 2016; this was followed by his debut mixtape, Call Me Loose, in 2018 and Music, Trial & Trauma: A Drill Story, his debut album, in 2020. In 2021, Loski released his debut EP, Censored.

In 2023, O'Connor was convicted of possessing a loaded revolver and sentenced to 7 years in prison.

Early life
Jyrelle Justin O'Connor was born in Kennington, London on May 6, 1999. His father was Ty Nizzy, a member of the PDC rap group and "an originator of road rap", according to The Guardian. His mother studied English literature and history while attending university, which Loski said inspired storytelling within his songs. O'Connor said in an interview with VICE that both of his parents supported him in pursuing a musical career.

O'Connor moved from Kennington to Borehamwood to live with his grandmother at the age of 12 following a group of boys putting a gun to his head. He attended Hertswood Academy. In 2013, he was reported as missing from his house.

Career
During O'Connor's early musical career, he went under the name Lil' Nizzy, in reference to his father. He released a song alongside Danks in 2012.

Under the name Loski, he released his breakout single, "Hazards", in 2016. Other early songs included "Money and Beef", "DJ Khaled" and "Teddy Bruckshot".

In March 2018, Loski was signed to Sony Music Entertainment. The following month, he released his debut mixtape Call Me Loose, which peaked at number 44 on the UK Albums Chart and was named as one of the inspirations for Scorpion by Drake. In an article with MTV, Loski stated that the mixtape was about "the neighbourhood, friends, everything growing up". The following year, he released the mixtape Mad Move, which peaked at number 41. An article in Versus noted that the mixtape "sees the south Londoner plant himself firmly at the fore of the genre."

In 2020, Loski released his debut album, Music, Trial & Trauma: A Drill Story, which peaked at number 39 on the UK Albums Chart and was noted as being "several albums at once". Robert Kazandjian, writing for Clash, stated that the album was divided into three acts, with the album as a whole mainly centered around legal issues.

In September 2021, Loski announced his debut EP, Censored. The EP was released on 15 October; an article in Trench noted that "although the extensive cast of producers keep the Censoreds sound close to Loski's drill roots, the rapper's evolution is laid bare as he attacks each track with an effortless display of lyrical greaze."

Legal issues
In 2015, O'Connor was convicted of possession of a sawn-off shotgun. In 2016, O'Connor was sentenced to prison after being found in possession of a knife. He was released in 2017.

On 9 April 2019, he was stopped by police while travelling to Willesden; they found him in possession of a revolver. O'Connor was charged with possession of a firearm, intent to endanger life, and possession of ammunition as a result; his first trial resulted in a retrial as a result of his prosecutor falling ill, while the second resulted in a hung jury. He was found guilty of possessing a prohibited firearm on 5 January 2023 and was sentenced to 7 years in prison.

Discography

Studio albums

Mixtapes

EPs

Singles

As lead artist

As featured artist

Awards and nominations

References

21st-century British rappers
Black British male rappers
English male rappers
British hip hop musicians
Rappers from London
UK drill musicians
Gangsta rappers
People from Kennington
Living people
1999 births